Delta Kream is the tenth album by American rock duo the Black Keys, released through Easy Eye Sound and Nonesuch Records on May 14, 2021. It is a cover album of hill country blues songs. It was preceded by the April 15 release of a cover of "Crawling Kingsnake", based on Junior Kimbrough's rendition.

Background, recording and packaging
The album was recorded "in about 10 hours" over two afternoons at Dan Auerbach's Easy Eye Sound studio in Nashville at the end of the Let's Rock tour, with little planning and no advance rehearsals. It includes contributions from R. L. Burnside's guitarist Kenny Brown as well as Junior Kimbrough's bassist Eric Deaton; the Black Keys had previously covered Burnside's "Skinny Woman" (titled "Busted") and Kimbrough's "Do the Romp" (titled "Do the Rump") on their 2002 debut album The Big Come Up, and released the Kimbrough tribute album Chulahoma: The Songs of Junior Kimbrough in 2006. Brown and Deaton had been recording at Easy Eye Sound studio concurrently along with Auerbach for the album Sharecropper's Son by Robert Finley, which lead to their availability for the Delta Kream sessions.

In a statement, Auerbach said: "We made this record to honor the Mississippi hill country blues tradition that influenced us starting out. These songs are still as important to us today as they were the first day Pat and I started playing together and picked up our instruments."

The album cover features a 1970s photograph by William Eggleston of the Delta Kream shop in Tunica, Mississippi, with an Oldsmobile Cutlass parked outside – the shop no longer exists.

Promotion and release
The Black Keys announced Delta Kream on April 13, 2021, exclusively through their Lonely Boys and Girls fan club. Through the fan club, on the same day, they also released the album's lead single, a cover of Junior Kimbrough's version of "Crawling Kingsnake". It was released to digital music platforms two days later. Additionally, a music video for the song was released. Directed by Tim Hardiman, it features a performance of the song by the band at the Blue Front Cafe, owned by blues musician Jimmy "Duck" Holmes.

Delta Kream was released on May 14, 2021, through Easy Eye Sound and Nonesuch Records on digital music platforms and physical media. The album's digital release includes a shortened edit of "Crawling Kingsnake" as a bonus track. Physically, the album was made available to purchase as both a CD and double 12-inch vinyl record, with standard black, limited edition "purple haze", and Spotify user-exclusive pink options available for the vinyl release.

Track listing

Personnel
The Black Keys
 Dan Auerbach – lead vocals, electric guitar, production
 Patrick Carney – drums, percussion, production

Additional personnel
 Eric Deaton – bass
 Kenny Brown – electric guitar
 Sam Bacco – additional percussion
 Ryan Smith – mastering
 Tchad Blake – mixing
 M. Allen Parker – engineering
 Caleb VanBuskirk – additional engineering
 Michael Deano – engineering assistance
 Mickey Smay – engineering assistance

Charts

Weekly charts

Year-end charts

References

2021 albums
Albums produced by Dan Auerbach
Albums produced by Patrick Carney
Covers albums
The Black Keys albums
Nonesuch Records albums